Alor Island Airport , also known as Mali Airport, is an airport in Alor Island, Indonesia.

Airlines and destinations

References

Alor Archipelago
Airports in East Nusa Tenggara